Bathou also spelt as Bathu is a village of Attock District in the Punjab Province of Pakistan. It is located at an altitude of 366 metres (1204 feet).

References

Villages in Attock District